The Curse of Sleeping Beauty is a 2016 American fantasy horror film directed by Pearry Reginald Teo and written by Teo alongside Josh Nadler. The film stars Ethan Peck, India Eisley and Natalie Hall. It is based on a comic book of the same name by Everette Hartsoe and the story Little Briar Rose by the Brothers Grimm and Charles Perrault.

Filming took place in Los Angeles, California. The film was released by 2B Films on May 13, 2016.

Plot
Thomas Kaiser, a painter, has recurring dreams in which he sees a beautiful sleeping girl (India Eisley), but is unable to wake her. When he attempts to kiss her, he is always distracted by a vision of a strange building and wakes in sleep paralysis. One day, he receives a phone call from a law firm informing him of an inheritance from his estranged uncle, Clive.

Thomas is informed his uncle committed suicide, leaving him a letter and a property known as Kaiser Gardens. The letter tells him to never go to the lower levels of the building and that the family is cursed. Thomas is startled to find out the inherited property is the very same building from his dreams. While at Kaiser Gardens, Thomas runs into a realtor Linda (Natalie Hall) who gives him the keys and asks him a series of questions. That night while sleeping at the property he dreams of the sleeping girl and this time is able to kiss and awaken her. She tells him her name is Briar Rose and that they can communicate now that they are close in the physical world. He has a false awakening to an attack from the Veiled Demon. He wakes up from the nightmare to Billings (Scott Alan Smith) an appraiser knocking on the front door. The appraiser tells him many people went missing in the house, but the police found nothing. Thomas explores the house and finds mannequins and an unmovable door shrine.

Later, while researching the property, Thomas collapses. He discovers a note from Linda regarding a prior appraisal attempt. He confronts her and she informs him her brother went missing in the house. Thomas collapses again and dreams of Rose. She tells him he must awaken her and the property belongs to his bloodline. Thomas awakens, Linda informs him that based on her research he is now bound to the property supernaturally and will die if he leaves Kaiser Gardens too long. They return to the property and open the shrine door and, using Thomas' blood, revealing a room. They open a book with seals and are attacked by the mannequins in the house. They escape the house with the book and are rescued by Richard Meyers (Bruce Davison), a paranormal investigator, who is friends with Linda.

Richard tells Thomas they were attacked by a djinn and that the djinn can possess inanimate objects. Thomas believes he must wake Rose in order to break the curse. They hired Daniel (James Adam Lim), an acquaintance of Linda to decipher the book found in Kaiser Gardens. Billings returns to the property and is killed by the Veiled Demon. They discover that the family curse dates back to the Crusades and a djinn put Rose in an eternal sleep. The group deduces that Iblis wants her and they must kill the Veiled Demon and awaken Rose.

Thomas, Linda and Richard return to Kaiser Gardens and open a second door behind the shrine room. Linda and Richard distract the Veiled Demon while Thomas finds and attempts to wake Rose. Unable to wake Rose with a kiss, Thomas uses his blood. Rose awakens then kisses and attacks Thomas. Rose kills the Veiled Demon, but before doing so, it tells them that Thomas' bloodline 'stores' many demons, which Rose will summon to unleash upon the world. Rose states she will not kill them so they can see the darkness to come and begins to awaken the demons in Thomas' bloodline. Meanwhile, after the full text from the book is deciphered Daniel reads the curse that awakening the demons in Thomas' bloodline will trigger the Apocalypse.

Cast

Release
The film was released on May 13, 2016 (Friday the 13th) in the United States.

Reception
The film has been received mostly negative reviews. On Rotten Tomatoes, the film has a rating of 15% based on 13 reviews and an average rating of 3.9/10. Luke Thompson of Forbes panned the film stating it "fractures more than a fairy tale". Frank Scheck of The Hollywood Reporter reviewed the film as a "cheesy horror film ... enough to put anyone to sleep".

Television series
In October 2017, a television series based on the film was announced is in development.

References

External links
 
 

2016 films
2016 horror films
American dark fantasy films
American supernatural horror films
American haunted house films
Supernatural fantasy films
Demons in film
Religious horror films
Films about curses
Films based on American comics
Films based on Sleeping Beauty
Horror films based on children's franchises
Films shot in Los Angeles
Live-action films based on comics
2010s English-language films
Films directed by Pearry Reginald Teo
2010s American films